Travel Air was an airline based in Port Moresby, Papua New Guinea. It operated charter and scheduled passenger services. Its main base was at Jacksons International Airport, Port Moresby. In 2016 the airline ceased all operations.

History
The airline was established and started operations in 2010. The airline is also known as Mangi lo Ples and was rescued by Indonesian firm Trans Global Investments in February 2016.

Fleet
The Travel Air fleet consisted of 4 Fokker 50 aircraft (at June 2016).

Destinations
The airline served 11 domestic destinations in the country:
Alotau
Buka
Hoskins
Kokopo
Lae
Madang
Mt Hagen
Popondetta
Port Moresby
Vanimo
Wewak

References

Defunct airlines of Papua New Guinea
Airlines established in 2010
Airlines disestablished in 2016